James Henry Randell (13 August 1928 – 21 June 2016) was an Australian politician.

Politics 
He was the National Party member for Mirani in the Queensland Legislative Assembly from 1980 to 1994.

References

1928 births
2016 deaths
National Party of Australia members of the Parliament of Queensland
Members of the Queensland Legislative Assembly